Cryptosara caritalis is a moth in the family Crambidae. It was described by Francis Walker in 1859. It is found in Cameroon, the Republic of Congo, the Democratic Republic of Congo, Mauritius, Sierra Leone and Togo.

References

Moths described in 1859
Pyraustinae